Kazi Sekendar Ali Dalim ( – 14 January 2020) was a Bangladesh Nationalist Party politician and a member of Parliament for the constituency of Khulna-3.

Biography
Dalim was a member of the executive committee of the Bangladesh Nationalist Party. He joined the Bangladesh Awami League in 1996 and was elected to parliament from Khulna-3 as a Bangladesh Awami League candidate in 1996. Later, he returned to the Bangladesh Nationalist Party.

Dalim died on 14 January 2020 at Combined Medical Hospital in Dhaka at the age of 75.

References

Awami League politicians
Bangladesh Nationalist Party politicians
1940s births
2020 deaths
7th Jatiya Sangsad members
People from Khulna District